K-1 PREMIUM Dynamite!! (or Dynamite!!) was an annual kickboxing and mixed martial arts event held in Japan by the Fighting and Entertainment Group. It began as a co-production between PRIDE Fighting Championships and K-1 held on August 28, 2002. The event was called K-1 Dynamite! by K-1 and PRIDE Shockwave by PRIDE Fighting Championships', though in Japan it was simply called Dynamite!. The live audience totaled 91,108 people, and is the largest on record for either organization or any professional fighting event. Dynamite!! events were unique that they held cards with both MMA and K-1 Kickboxing bouts on them. Later they became co-productions with Fighting and Entertainment Group's own MMA promotions—Hero's and later DREAM—and the only event in a foreign country, called Dynamite!! USA, was a co-production with EliteXC and the only pure MMA event of the Dynamite!! series.

Events

See also 
K-1
List of K-1 Events
PRIDE Fighting Championships
List of PRIDE events
Kickboxing
Mixed Martial Arts

References

External links 
K-1 Official website
K-1sport.de - biggest K-1 database, articles, profiles, statistics

K-1 events
Pride Fighting Championships events